Oligia divesta is a species of cutworm or dart moth in the family Noctuidae. It is found in North America.

The MONA or Hodges number for Oligia divesta is 9559.

References

Further reading

 
 
 

Oligia
Articles created by Qbugbot
Moths described in 1874